Events from the year 1579 in Sweden

Incumbents
 Monarch – John III

Events

 - Princess Cecilia of Sweden is exiled to Germany. 
 
  
 
 

 - Sweden is struck by the plague.

Births

 - Johannes Messenius, historian, dramatist and university professor (died 1636)

Deaths

 - Laurentius Petri Gothus,  Lutheran Archbishop of Uppsala (born year unknown)

References

 
Years of the 16th century in Sweden
Sweden